Odilo may refer to:
 Saint Odilo of Cluny (born c.962), fifth Benedictine Abbot of Cluny
 Odilo, Duke of Bavaria (d. 748), son of Gotfrid of the house of Agilolfing
 Odilo Scherer, the Cardinal Archbishop of the Roman Catholic Archdiocese of São Paulo, Brazil
 Odilo Globocnik, Austrian Nazi leader and Holocaust perpetrator